Malice may refer to:

Law
 Malice (law), a legal term describing the intent to harm

Geography
 Malice, Kuyavian-Pomeranian Voivodeship, in north-central Poland
 Malice, Lublin Voivodeship, in eastern Poland
 Malice, Świętokrzyskie Voivodeship, in south-central Poland

Entertainment

Film and literature
 Malice (1926 film), a 1926 German silent film directed by Manfred Noa
 Malice (1993 film), a 1993 film starring  Alec Baldwin, Nicole Kidman and Bill Pullman
 Malice, a novel by American romance author Danielle Steel
 Malice, a novel by Japanese author Keigo Higashino (first published as Akui in 1996)
 Malice (series), a 2009 young adult novel series by Chris Wooding
 Malice (character), the name of four different Marvel Comics villains
 "Malice" (Stargate Universe), a 2010 episode of Stargate Universe

Music
 Malice (British band), a UK punk rock group from Crawley, predecessor of The Cure
 Malice (American band), an American heavy metal group
 Malice (Through the Eyes of the Dead album), 2007
 Malice (Gehenna album), 1996

Video games
 Malice (1997 video game), a 1997 total conversion for Quake released by Quantum Axcess
 Malice (2004 video game), a 2004 video game for PS2 and Xbox developed by Argonaut Games

People
 Charly Malice, ring name of Charly Manson
 Jerry Tuite (1966–2003), American professional wrestler also known by the ring name Malice
Luigi Malice, Italian abstract artist
 Malice Green (died 1992), man who died in the custody of Detroit Police after being arrested
 Michael Malice (born 1976), author, podcaster, columnist, and media personality
 No Malice (formerly Malice, born 1972), stage name of Gene Thornton, half of the hip-hop duo Clipse

See also